The Guardian Threat Tracking System is a reporting system used by the United States Federal Bureau of Investigation to track threats and other intelligence information. It was established to collect data on terrorist threats and suspicious incidents, at seaports and other locations, and to manage action on various threats and incidents.  Although Guardian was first used the latest of 2005, on August 21, 2007, the US Department of Defense announced that Guardian would take over data collection and reporting which had been handled by the TALON database system.

References

See also
 Governmental database
 War on Terror

Government databases in the United States
Espionage
Federal Bureau of Investigation
United States national security policy
Security databases